Roscoe Township may refer to:

 Roscoe Township, Winnebago County, Illinois
 Roscoe Township, Davis County, Iowa
 Roscoe Township, Reno County, Kansas, in Reno County, Kansas
 Roscoe Township, Goodhue County, Minnesota
 Roscoe Township, St. Clair County, Missouri
 Roscoe Township, LaMoure County, North Dakota, in LaMoure County, North Dakota

Township name disambiguation pages